Lumacaftor (VX-809) is a pharmaceutical drug that acts as a chaperone during protein folding and increases the number of CFTR proteins that are trafficked to the cell surface. It is available in a single pill with ivacaftor; the combination, lumacaftor/ivacaftor (brand name Orkambi), is used to treat people with cystic fibrosis who are homozygous for the F508del mutation in the cystic fibrosis transmembrane conductance regulator (CFTR) gene, the defective protein that causes the disease.    It was developed by Vertex Pharmaceuticals and the combination was approved by the FDA in 2015.  As of 2015, lumacaftor had no medical use on its own.

See also
 Ataluren, targeting premature stop codons

References

CYP3A4 inducers
Organofluorides
Carboxylic acids
Cystic fibrosis
Cyclopropanes
Orphan drugs